Richard Henry Carmona (born November 22, 1949)  is an American physician, nurse, police officer, public health administrator, and politician. He was a vice admiral in the Public Health Service Commissioned Corps and served as the seventeenth Surgeon General of the United States. Appointed by President George W. Bush in 2002, Carmona left office at the end of July 2006 upon the expiration of his term. After leaving office, Carmona was highly critical of the Bush administration for suppressing scientific findings which conflicted with the administration's ideological agenda.

In August 2006, Carmona returned home to Tucson, Arizona. In November 2011, he announced he would seek the Democratic Party's nomination for United States Senate in the hopes of succeeding outgoing Republican Senator Jon Kyl, despite being registered as a political Independent. He narrowly lost to Republican challenger Congressman Jeff Flake.

Early life, education, and early career
Carmona was born in New York City, of Puerto Rican descent, and raised in Harlem. After dropping out of DeWitt Clinton High School at age 16, he enlisted in the U.S. Army in 1967. While enlisted, he received his General Educational Development (GED), joined the United States Army Special Forces, became a combat-decorated Vietnam veteran, and began his career in medicine as a Special Forces Medic.

After leaving active duty, Carmona attended the Bronx Community College of the City University of New York, where he earned his associate of arts degree in nursing. In 1977, he graduated from the University of California, San Francisco (UCSF), with a bachelor of science degree in biology and chemistry; in 1979, he received his medical degree from UCSF, where he was awarded the gold-headed cane as the top graduate. In 1998, he earned a Master's degree in Public Health (M.P.H.) from the University of Arizona.

Medical career
Carmona worked in various positions in the medical field including paramedic, registered nurse, and physician. He completed a surgical residency at UCSF and a National Institutes of Health-sponsored fellowship in trauma, burns, and critical care. Carmona is a Fellow of the American College of Surgeons and certified in correctional health care and in quality assurance. Carmona has been Chairman of the Arizona Southern Regional Emergency Medical System, Chief Medical Officer, hospital CEO, public health officer, and chief executive officer of the Pima County health care system. In 1997, the Pima County system, which was in financial trouble before he was appointed, continued to lose millions of dollars and he resigned. Carmona was not in control of the assets of the system but was held responsible for them. Carmona is also a professor of medicine at the University of Arizona.

Law enforcement career
Carmona worked for the Pima County Sheriff's Department since 1986, eventually working his way up to deputy sheriff. He served as medical director of the county's police and fire departments. He was a peace officer leader of the SWAT division, with expertise in special operations and emergency preparedness, including weapons of mass destruction.

In 1999, Carmona was off duty when he killed a motorist in a shootout at a Tucson intersection. Accounts of the incident vary, but Carmona says he spotted a driver assaulting another driver after a car accident and pulled over to help. Bystanders warned Carmona that the motorist was armed, and in the confrontation that ensued, which started by the motorist starting to place his gun down but quickly after grabs and shoots, grazing Carmona in the head,  Carmona fired his weapon seven times, hitting the man three times and killing him. In the police interview at the scene, Carmona told officials he did not try to administer first aid after shooting the victim. Instead, he returned to his car to reload his weapon.

Surgeon General

Nomination
President Bush nominated Carmona to become the 17th Surgeon General of the United States in March 2002. During the nomination process, Carmona was questioned about his management style and the amount of time it took him to become board-certified in his field. Carmona described himself as an "agent of change" willing to question the status quo, but that he always treated "patients, staff, and co-workers with respect."  Senators on both sides of the aisle praised Carmona's qualifications and supported his nomination; he was confirmed by the U.S. Senate on July 23, 2002 by a vote of 98–0.

Secondhand smoke

In 2006, Carmona released a landmark Surgeon General's report on the health effects of secondhand smoke. Carmona's report underlined the risks of secondhand smoke exposure, stating: "The debate is over. The science is clear: Secondhand smoke is not a mere annoyance, but a serious health hazard." The report encouraged the adoption of indoor smoking bans and noted that such bans did not appear to have a harmful economic effect on bars and restaurants. After leaving office, Carmona testified before Congress that the Bush Administration had tried for years to "water down" his findings on the dangers of secondhand smoke, and had pressured him not to testify in the tobacco industry's racketeering trial.

In earlier testimony before the U.S. Congress, Carmona stated that he would not object to a ban on all tobacco products "if Congress chose to go that way." The Bush Administration distanced itself from this statement.

Post-Surgeon General career
Carmona is currently vice chairman of the Canyon Ranch resort and spa company, president of the non-profit Canyon Ranch Institute, and a professor at the Mel and Enid Zuckerman College of Public Health at the University of Arizona. He is currently in-charge of Covid-19 response at the University of Arizona. On June 16, 2010, Ross University School of Medicine named Carmona to its Board of Trustees.

In 2006, Republicans attempted to recruit Carmona to run for Congress in Arizona's 8th congressional district, but he declined.

On October 25, 2013 Carmona joined the Herbalife Board of Directors. Dr. Carmona commented, "As a scientist and medical professional, I was first attracted by the depth and breadth of Herbalife's commitment to excellence in nutrition science. As a business person, my due diligence showed me a company of integrity with a good business plan. As the son of poor emigrant parents, I am elated to see the opportunities Herbalife offers to families in health-disparate and economically underserved communities."

On September 6, 2021 Carmona joined the McKesson Board of Directors as a new independent director, as well as the Board of Directors Compensation and Compliance Committees.

Criticism of Bush administration
On July 10, 2007, Carmona, along with former Surgeons General C. Everett Koop and David Satcher, testified before the United States House Committee on Oversight and Government Reform about political and ideological interference with the Surgeon General's mission. Carmona accused the Bush Administration of preventing him from speaking out on certain public health issues such as embryonic stem cell research, global climate change, emergency contraception, and  abstinence-only sex education, where the Administration's political stance conflicted with scientific and medical opinion.

Carmona also testified that the Bush Administration had attempted for years to "water down" his report on the dangers of secondhand smoke and pressured him not to testify in the tobacco industry's racketeering trial: "Anything that doesn't fit into the political appointees' ideological, theological or political agenda is ignored, marginalized or simply buried." According to Carmona, he was even ordered not to attend the Special Olympics because the event was sponsored by the Kennedy family, and was told to mention President Bush three times on every page of his speeches.  The Washington Post subsequently identified William R. Steiger as the Bush Administration official who had blocked release of Carmona's report on global health because it conflicted with the Administration's political priorities.

Carmona said that his predecessors as Surgeon General had told him, "We have never seen it as partisan, as malicious, as vindictive, as mean-spirited as it is today, and you clearly have worse than anyone's had." Koop's testimony indicated that he had been subject to less political pressure than his successors: President Reagan was pressed by his officials to fire him, but Reagan refused. Moreover, Koop indicated that each of his successors had had less access to the Secretary of Health and Human Services than he had: Satcher had been granted less access than him, and "Dr. Carmona was treated with even less respect than Dr. Satcher."

2012 U.S. Senate election

Carmona was the Democratic nominee for U.S. Senate in Arizona in the race to replace retiring Republican Senator Jon Kyl. Carmona said that he would bring his experience in science and medicine to the Senate, which will inform his analytical approach to the issues. He has been critical of politicians like Todd Akin and said that health issues should not be politicized.

On November 6, 2012, he lost to Republican challenger Jeff Flake.

Electoral history

Personal life
Carmona is married to Diana Sanchez. They have two daughters, two sons, two granddaughters, and two grandsons. Carmona resides in Tucson, Arizona.

Awards and decorations
Awards and decorations as depicted on Vice Admiral Carmona's United States Public Health Service Commissioned Corps' uniform during his tenure as Surgeon General of the United States.

See also

 List of Puerto Ricans
 List of Puerto Rican military personnel

References

External links
 
 Campaign contributions at OpenSecrets
 Office of the Surgeon General Richard H. Carmona (2002–2006), U.S. Department of Health and Human Services, January 4, 2007. Internet Archive Wayback Machine link, 16 April 2018.
 Hispanic Americans in the U.S. Army
 Dr. Richard Carmona: Nonpartisan Solutions Needed in Wake of Tucson Tragedy – video report by Democracy Now!
 Meet Our Candidates: Dr. Richard Carmona for U.S. Senator – exclusive interview with Planned Parenthood Advocates of Arizona
 

|-

1949 births
United States Army personnel of the Vietnam War
American nurses
American politicians of Puerto Rican descent
American surgeons
Arizona Democrats
Arizona Independents
City University of New York alumni
DeWitt Clinton High School alumni
Living people
Male nurses
Paramedics
People from Harlem
Politicians from Tucson, Arizona
Puerto Rican Army personnel
Surgeons General of the United States
United States Public Health Service Commissioned Corps admirals
University of Arizona alumni
University of Arizona faculty
United States Army soldiers
University of California, San Francisco alumni
Bronx Community College alumni